Pluméliau is a former commune in the Morbihan department of Brittany in north-western France. On 1 January 2019, it was merged into the new commune Pluméliau-Bieuzy.

Geography
The ruisseau de Kergouët forms part of the commune's eastern border, then flows into the Ével, which forms its south-eastern border.

Demographics
Inhabitants of Pluméliau are called in French Plumelois.

See also
Communes of the Morbihan department
Henri Gouzien, sculptor of Pluméliau War Memorial

References

External links

 Cultural Heritage 

Former communes of Morbihan